This is a list of rivers in the U.S. state of New York.

By drainage basin

This list is arranged by drainage basin, with respective tributaries indented by order of confluence with their main stem, from mouth to source.

Long Island Sound (northern side)

Housatonic River (CT)
Tenmile River
Swamp River
Mill River
Webatuck Creek
Green River
Norwalk River (CT)
Silvermine River
Rippowam River
Mill River
Mianus River
Byram River
Wampus River
Blind Brook
Mamaroneck River
Sheldrake River
Hutchinson River
Hudson River

Long Island
Long Island Sound
Nissequogue River
Wading River

Block Island Sound
Peconic River
Little River

Atlantic Ocean
Carmans River 10 miles
Connetquot River 6 miles
Forge River 3.2 miles
Swan River 2 miles
Patchogue River 1 mile
Carlls River
Massapequa Creek
Seaford Creek
Bellmore Creek
East Meadow Brook
Cedar Swamp Creek
Mill River
Aspatuck River
Speonk River

New York Harbor

Arthur Kill (tidal strait)
Fresh Kills
Richmond Creek
Passaic River (NJ)
Saddle River
Pompton River (NJ)
Pequannock River (NJ)
Wanaque River
Ringwood River
Ramapo River
Mahwah River
Hackensack River
Pascack Brook
Kill Van Kull (tidal strait)
East River (tidal strait)
Newtown Creek
Harlem River (tidal strait)
Bronx Kill (tidal strait) 
Bronx River
Flushing River
Westchester Creek

Hudson River Basin

Hudson River (also known as the North River)
Saw Mill River
Rum Brook
Mine Brook
Nanny Hagen Brook
Tertia Brook 
Wickers Creek
Sparkill Creek
Pocantico River
Caney Brook
Rockefeller Brook
Gory Brook
Sing Sing Brook
Croton River
Kisco River
Muscoot River
Cross River
Stone Hill River
Waccabuc River
Titicus River
East Branch Croton River
West Branch Croton River
Minisceongo Creek
Cedar Pond Brook
Annsville Creek
Peekskill Hollow Creek
Sprout Brook
Canopus Creek
Broccy Creek
Popolopen Creek
Hemlock Brook
Highland Brook
Stoney Lonesome Brook
Arden Brook
Indian Brook
Crows Nest Brook
Foundry Brook
Breakneck Brook
Moodna Creek
Silver Stream
Woodbury Creek
Mineral Spring Brook
Cromline Creek
Otter Kill
Black Meadow Creek
Beaverdam Brook
Gordons Brook
Wades Brook
Squirrel Hollow Creek
Fishkill Creek
Clove Creek
Sprout Creek
Jackson Creek
Whortlekill Creek
Quassaick Creek
Bushfield Creek
Gedneytown Creek
Wappinger Creek
Little Wappinger Creek
Lattintown Creek
Casperkill
Fonteyn Kill
Fall Kill
Twaalfskill Creek
Maritje Kill
Crum Elbow Creek
Bard Rock Creek
Indian Kill
North Staatsburg Creek
Black Creek (Hudson River tributary)
Fallsburg Creek
Landsman Kill
Rhinebeck Kill
Rondout Creek
Wallkill River
Shawangunk Kill
Dwaar Kill (Shawangunk Kill tributary)
Pakasink Creek
Verkeerder Kill
Platte Kill (Shawangunk Kill tributary)
Little Shawangunk Kill
Dwaar Kill (Wallkill River tributary)
Tin Brook
Muddy Kill
Mannayunk Kill
Monhagen Brook
Pochuck Creek
Wawayanda Creek
Rutgers Creek
Catlin Creek
Joe Creek
Indigot Creek
Cottekill Brook
Coxing Kill
Kripplebush Creek
Peters Kill
Stony Kill
Sanders Kill
Rochester Creek
Mill Brook (Rochester Creek tributary)
Vly Brook
Mettacahonts Creek
Ver Nooy Kill
Beer Kill Creek
Fantine Kill
Brandy Brook
Trout Creek (Rondout Creek tributary)
Chestnut Creek (Rondout Creek tributary)
Sugarloaf Brook
Sundown Creek
High Falls Brook
Stone Cabin Brook
Bear Hole Brook
Buttermilk Falls Brook
Picket Brook
Mudder Kill
Saw Kill
Lakes Kill
Stony Creek
Esopus Creek
Plattekill Creek (Esopus Creek tributary)
Saw Kill (Esopus Creek tributary)
Bush Kill (Esopus Creek tributary)
Maltby Hollow Brook
Wittenberg Brook
South Hollow Brook
Kanape Brook
Little Beaver Kill (Esopus Creek tributary)
Beaver Kill (Esopus Creek tributary)
Woodland Creek
Muddy Brook (Woodland Creek tributary)
Panther Kill
Dougherty Branch
Stony Clove Creek
Hollow Tree Brook
Bushnellsville Creek
Angle Creek (Bushnellsville Creek tributary)
Birch Creek (Esopus Creek tributary)
Elk Bushkill
Sawyer Kill
Roeliff Jansen Kill
Shekomeko Creek
Bean River
Bash Bish Brook
Catskill Creek
Kaaterskill Creek
Potic Creek
Cob Creek
Jan De Bakkers Kill
Basic Creek
Wolf Fly Creek
Bowery Creek
Tenmile Creek
Eightmile Creek
Fox Creek
Lake Creek
Stockport Creek
Claverack Creek
Taghkanic Creek
Kinderhook Creek
Valatie Kill
Kline Kill
Stony Kill
Tackawasick Creek
Wyomanock Creek
Black River
 Mill Creek
Coxsackie Creek
Hannacrois Creek
Coeymans Creek
Mosher Brook
Onesquethaw Creek
Schodack Creek
Muitzes Kill
Mill Creek
Vloman Kill
Dowers Kill
Phillipin Kill
Moordener Kill
Normans Kill
Bozen Kill
Wynants Kill
Poesten Kill
Quacken Kill
Mohawk River
Alplaus Kill
Delphus Kill
Shakers Creek
Lisha Kill
Plotter Kill
Moccasin Kill
Sandsea Kill
Terwilleger Creek
North Chuctanunda Creek
South Chuctanunda Creek
Schoharie Creek
Cobleskill Creek
West Creek
Fox Creek
Switz Kill
Batavia Kill
Little West Kill
West Kill
Hunter Brook
East Kill
Auries Creek
Cayadutta Creek
Van Wie Creek
Yatesville Creek
Lasher Creek
Flat Creek
Canajoharie Creek
Otsquago Creek
Otsquene Creek
Otstungo Creek
Loyal Creek
Caroga Creek
Peck Creek
Sprite Creek
Mill Creek
Glasgow Creek
North Creek
East Canada Creek
Spruce Creek
Sprite Creek
Nowadaga Creek
West Canada Creek
Honnedaga Brook
Seabury Brook
Big Brook
 Mill Creek
Mad Tom Brook
Concklin Brook
Cincinnati Creek
Shed Brook
Mill Brook
Indian River
Metcalf Brook
Betty Green Brook
South Branch West Canada Creek
Fourmile Brook
Mill Creek
Cold Brook
Oklahoma Creek
White Creek
Grandpa’s River (White Creek tributary)
City Brook
Maltanner Creek
Stony Creek
North Creek
Fulmer Creek
Flat Creek
Day Creek
Steele Creek
Moyer Creek
Sauquoit Creek
Oriskany Creek
Ninemile Creek
Sixmile Creek
Hurlbut Glen Brook
Wells Creek
Tannery Brook
Stringer Brook
Lansing Kill
Haynes Brook
Blue Brook
Hoosic River
Tomhannock Creek
Owl Kill
Walloomsac River
Little Hoosic River
Fish Creek
Kayaderosseras Creek
Glowegee Creek
Batten Kill
Slocum Creek
Moses Kill
Dead Creek
Snook Kill
Champlain Canal
Sturdevant Creek
Sacandaga River
Paul Creek
Kennyetto Creek
East Stony Creek
West Stony Creek
West Branch Sacandaga River
Hamilton Lake Stream
Piseco Outlet
Fall Stream
East Branch Sacandaga River
Kunjamuk River
Schroon River
Trout Brook
Minerva Stream
The Branch
Patterson Brook
North Creek
Boreas River
Indian River
Jessup River
Miami River
Cedar River
Rock River
Goodnow River
Newcomb River
Opalescent River

Delaware River Basin

Delaware River
Neversink River
Basher Kill
Sheldrake Stream
East Branch Neversink River
Erts Brook
Riley Brook
Tray Mill Brook
Flat Brook (East Branch Neversink River tributary)
Deer Shanty Brook
Donovan Brook
West Branch Neversink River
Fall Brook (West Branch Neversink River tributary)
Flat Brook (West Branch Neversink River tributary)
High Falls Brook
Biscuit Brook
Pigeon Brook
Mongaup River
Black Brook (Mongaup River tributary)
West Branch Mongaup River
Middle Mongaup River
East Mongaup River
Tenmile River
Callicoon Creek
East Branch Callicoon Creek
North Branch Callicoon Creek
Hankins Creek
Basket Creek
North Branch Basket Creek
East Branch Basket Creek
Hoolihan Brook
Pea Brook
Bouchoux Brook
Abe Lord Creek
Humphries Brook
Blue Mill Stream
East Branch Delaware River
Beaver Kill
Willowemoc Creek
Little Beaver Kill
Fir Brook
Jersey Brook
Voorhees Brook
Shin Creek
Mary Smith Brook
Upper Beech Hill Brook
Alder Creek (Beaver Kill tributary)
Scudder Brook
Black Brook (Beaver Kill tributary)
Gulf of Mexico Brook
Tremper Kill
Platte Kill
West Branch Delaware River
Oquaga Creek
Little Delaware River

Susquehanna River Basin

Susquehanna River
Chemung River
Baldwin Creek
Bentley Creek
Seeley Creek
South Creek
Mudlick Creek
Newtown Creek
Post Creek
Cohocton River
Meads Creek
Mud Creek
Campbell Creek
Fivemile Creek
Goff Creek
Tioga River
Canisteo River
Tuscarora Creek
North Branch Tuscarora Creek
Colonel Bills Creek
Bennetts Creek
Purdy Creek
Crosby Creek
Canacadea Creek
Cowanesque River
Troups Creek
North Fork Cowanesque River
Cayuta Creek
Wappasening Creek
Pipe Creek
Owego Creek 
Catatonk Creek
Willseyville Creek
East Branch Owego Creek
West Branch Owego Creek
Apalachin Creek
Nanticoke Creek
Choconut Creek
Chenango River
Page Brook
Tioughnioga River
Otselic River
Merrill Creek
Mud Creek
Dudley Creek
Hunts Creek
Labrador Creek
East Branch Tioughnioga River
West Branch Tioughnioga River
Genegantslet Creek
Bowman Creek
Mill Brook
Canasawacta Creek
Sangerfield River
Little Snake Creek
Snake Creek
Tuscarora Creek
Hotchkins Creek
Sanford Creek
Occanum Creek
Sage Creek
Ouaquaga Creek
Watersnake Creek
Belden Brook
Wylie Brook
Reed Creek
Cornell Creek
Kelsey Brook
Landers Creek
Osborn Brook
Newton Brook
Yaleville Creek
Unadilla River
Butternut Creek
Wharton Creek
Beaver Creek
Carrs Creek
Martin Brook
Ouleout Creek
Treadwell Creek
Sand Hill Creek
Brier Creek
Flax Island Creek
Otsdawa Creek
Mill Creek
Otego Creek
Charlotte Creek
Schenevus Creek
Elk Creek
Cherry Valley Creek
Burditt Brook
Black Brook
Chase Creek
Oaks Creek
Fly Creek
Muskrat Pond Outlet
Lidell Creek
Phinney Creek
Red Creek

St. Lawrence River Basin

Lake Champlain

Great Chazy River
Beaver Creek
North Branch Great Chazy River
Little Chazy River
Saranac River
North Branch Saranac River
Salmon River
Little Ausable River
Ausable River
East Branch Ausable River
West Branch Ausable River
Black Brook
Chubb River
Boquet River
North Branch Boquet River
Black River
La Chute
Northwest Bay Brook
East Bay
Poultney River
Mettawee River
Wood Creek (Champlain Canal)
Halfway Creek
Big Creek
Indian River

St. Lawrence River
Saint Lawrence River
English River
Chateauguay River
Marble River
Trout River
Little Trout River
Salmon River
Pike Creek
Little Salmon River
Farrington Brook
St. Regis River
Deer River
Trout Brook (Deer River tributary)
West Branch Deer River
West Branch St. Regis River
Trout Brook (St. Regis River tributary)
Stony Brook
Long Pond Outlet
Windfall Brook
Lake Ozonia Outlet
East Branch St. Regis River
Osgood River
Onion River
Raquette River
Plum Brook
Trout Brook (Raquette River tributary)
Jordan River
Bog River
Round Lake Stream
Ampersand Brook
Moose Creek
Cold River
Big Brook
Salmon River
Marion River
South Inlet
Grass River
Little River
Harrison Creek
Tanner Creek (Grass River tributary)
North Branch Grass River
Middle Branch Grass River
South Branch Grass River
Brandy Brook
Sucker Brook
Oswegatchie River
Indian River
Black Creek
Otter Creek
West Creek
Bonaparte Creek
Indian Creek
West Branch Oswegatchie River
Big Creek
Middle Branch Oswegatchie River
Palmer Creek
Little River
Robinson River
Chippewa Creek
Crooked Creek
Cranberry Creek
Mullet Creek
French Creek

Lake Ontario

Chaumont River
Perch River
Black River
Deer River
West Branch Deer River
Beaver River
Black Creek
Crystal Creek
Independence River
Roaring Brook
Otter Creek
Moose River
Pine Creek 
Middle Branch Moose River
North Branch Moose River
South Branch Moose River
Red River
Indian River
Cobblestone Creek
Otter Brook
Sugar River
Moose Creek
White River
Woodhull Creek
Little Woodhull Creek
Little Black Creek
Mill Creek
Stony Creek
Sandy Creek (Jefferson County, New York)
South Sandy Creek
Abijah Creek
Grunley Creek
North Branch Sandy Creek
Gulf Stream
Little Sandy Creek
Salmon River
North Branch Salmon River
Mad River
East Branch Salmon River
Little Salmon River
North Branch Little Salmon River
South Branch Little Salmon River

Oswego River
Oneida River
Caughdenoy Creek
Oneida Lake:
Scriba Creek
Chittenango Creek
Limestone Creek
Butternut Creek
Oneida Creek
Fish Creek
Wood Creek
East Branch Fish Creek
Point Rock Creek
West Branch Fish Creek
Little River (Fish Creek tributary)
Mad River
Little River (Mad River tributary)
Seneca River
Onondaga Lake:
Ninemile Creek
Ley Creek
Onondaga Creek
Skaneateles Creek
Owasco Outlet
Clyde River
Canandaigua Outlet
Flint Creek
Canandaigua Lake:
West River
Ganargua Creek
Mud Creek
Sucker Brook
Cayuga Lake:
Trumansburg Creek
Taughannock Creek
Salmon Creek
Fall Creek
Virgil Creek
Cayuga Inlet
Six Mile Creek
Enfield Creek
Buttermilk Creek
Seneca Lake:
Keuka Lake Outlet
Catharine Creek
Ninemile Creek
Sterling Creek
Irondequoit Creek

Genesee River
Black Creek (Genesee River-Monroe County, New York)
Oatka Creek
Honeoye Creek
Canaseraga Creek
Wiscoy Creek
Rush Creek
Cold Creek
Caneadea Creek
Black Creek (Genesee River-Allegany County, New York)
Angelica Creek
Baker Creek
Black Creek (Angelica Creek tributary)
Van Campen Creek
Vandermark Creek
Dyke Creek
Chenunda Creek
Cryder Creek
Salmon Creek
Otis Creek
Sandy Creek (Monroe County, New York)
Oak Orchard Creek
Johnson Creek
Eighteen Mile Creek
Niagara River
Fish Creek
Bloody Run
Gill Creek
Cayuga Creek
Woods Creek
Burnt Ship Creek
Gun Creek
Little Sixmile Creek
Big Sixmile Creek
Spicer Creek
Tonawanda Creek
Ellicott Creek
Two Mile Creek
Scajaquada Creek

Lake Erie
Buffalo River
Cazenovia Creek
East Branch Cazenovia Creek
West Branch Cazenovia Creek
Cayuga Creek (Erie County, New York)
Buffalo Creek
Hunters Creek
Eighteen Mile Creek
South Branch Eighteenmile Creek
Cattaraugus Creek
South Branch Cattaraugus Creek
Mansfield Creek
Buttermilk Creek
Canadaway Creek
Chautauqua Creek
Twentymile Creek
Silver Creek
Big Sister Creek

Mississippi River Basin
Mississippi River
Ohio River
Allegheny River
French Creek
Brokenstraw Creek
Conewango Creek
Stillwater Creek
Cassadaga Creek
Chadakoin River
Red House Brook
Little Valley Creek
Great Valley Creek
Wrights Creek
Forks Creek
Beaver Meadows Creek
Devereaux Branch
Tunungwant Creek
Rice Brook
Irish Brook
Bailley Brook
Leonard Brook
Limestone Brook
Nichols Run
Olean Creek
Ischua Creek
Gates Creek
Oil Creek
Haskell Creek
Dodge Creek
Oswayo Creek
Little Genesee Creek

Alphabetically

Abijah Creek
Allegheny River
Alplaus Kill
Ampersand Brook
Angelica Creek
Annsville Creek
Apalachin Creek
Arthur Kill (tidal strait)
Aspatuck River
Ausable River
Baldwin Creek
Baker Creek
Bash Bish Brook
Basher Kill
Basic Creek
Batten Kill
Bean River
Beaver Creek (Great Chazy River tributary)
Beaver Creek (Unadilla River tributary)
Beaver Kill
Beaver Kill (Esopus Creek tributary)
Beaver Meadows Creek
Beaver River
Beecher Creek
Bennetts Creek
Bentley Creek
Big Brook
Big Creek (Champlain Canal)
Big Creek (Oswegatchie River tributary)
Big Sixmile Creek (Grand Island, New York)
Black Brook (Ausable River tributary)
Black Brook (Mongaup River tributary)
Black Creek (Angelica Creek tributary)
Black Creek (Beaver River tributary)
Black Creek (Genesee River-Allegany County, New York)
Black Creek (Genesee River-Monroe County, New York)
Black Creek (Indian River tributary)
Black Creek (West Canada Creek tributary)
Black Meadow Creek
Black River, in the western Adirondacks
Black River (Boquet River tributary)
Black River (Kinderhook Creek tributary)
Bloody Run (Niagara County, New York)
Bog River
Bowman Creek
Bonaparte Creek
Boquet River
Boreas River
Bowery Creek
Bozen Kill
Brandy Brook
Bronx Kill (tidal strait)
Bronx River
Buffalo River (includes Buffalo Creek)
Burnt Ship Creek (Grand Island, New York)
Burditt Brook
Buttermilk Creek
Butternut Creek (Oneida Lake)
Butternut Creek (Limestone Creek tributary)
Butternut Creek (Unadilla River tributary)
Byram River
Callicoon Creek
Campbell Creek
Canacadea Creek
Canadaway Creek
Canajoharie Creek
Canandaigua Outlet
Canasawacta Creek
Caneadea Creek
Canisteo River
Carlls River
Carmans River
Caroga Creek
Casperkill
Catatonk Creek
Catharine Creek
Catskill Creek 
Cattaraugus Creek 
Caughdenoy Creek
Cayadutta Creek
Cayuga Creek (Erie County, New York)
Cayuga Creek (Niagara County, New York)
Cayuga Inlet
Cayuta Creek
Cazenovia Creek 
Cedar River
Cedar Swamp Creek
Chadakoin River
Champlain Canal
Charlotte Creek
Chateauguay River
Chaumont River
Chautauqua Creek
Chemung River
Chenango River
Chenunda Creek
Cherry Valley Creek
Chippewa Creek
Choconut Creek
Chubb River
Cincinnati Creek
Claverack Creek
Clove Creek
Clyde River
Cob Creek
Cobblestone Creek
Cobleskill Creek
Coeymans Creek
Cohocton River
Cold Brook
Cold Creek
Cold River
Coles Creek
Colonel Bills Creek
Conewango Creek
Connetquot River
Cowanesque River
Coxsackie Creek
Cranberry Creek
Cromline Creek
Crooked Creek
Crosby Creek
Cross River
Croton River
Cryder Creek
Crystal Creek
Dead Creek
Deer River (Black River tributary)
Deer River (St. Regis River tributary)
Delaware River
Devereaux Branch
Dodge Creek
Dowers Kill
Dudley Creek
Dwaar Kill (Shawangunk Kill tributary)
Dwaar Kill (Wallkill River tributary)
Dyke Creek
East Branch Ausable River
East Branch Callicoon Creek
East Branch Cazenovia Creek
East Branch Croton River
East Branch Delaware River
East Branch Neversink River
East Branch Owego Creek
East Branch Sacandaga River
East Branch St. Regis River
East Branch Salmon River
East Branch Tioughnioga River
East Canada Creek
East Kill
East Mongaup River
East River (tidal strait)
East Stony Creek
Eighteen Mile Creek (Erie County)
Eighteen Mile Creek (Niagara County)
Eightmile Creek
Ellicott Creek
English River
Esopus Creek
Fall Creek
Fall Stream
Farrington Brook
Fish Creek (Hudson River tributary)
Fish Creek (Niagara County, New York)
Fish Creek (Oneida Lake tributary)
Fishkill Creek
Fivemile Creek
Flat Creek (Mohawk River tributary)
Flat Creek (Fulmer Creek tributary)
Flint Creek
Flushing River
Fly Creek (Oaks Creek tributary)
Fly Creek (Sacandaga River tributary)
Fly Creek (Schoharie River tributary)
Forge River
Forks Creek
Fox Creek (Catskill Creek tributary)
Fox Creek (Schoharie Creek tributary)
French Creek (Allegheny River tributary)
French Creek (St. Lawrence River tributary)
Fresh Kills
Fulmer Creek
Gates Creek
Genesee River
Gill Creek (Niagara County, New York)
Glowegee Creek
Goff Creek
Goodnow River
Grasse River
Great Chazy River
Green River
Grunley Creek
Gulf Stream
Gun Creek (Grand Island, New York)
Hackensack River
Halfway Creek
Hamilton Lake Stream
Hannacrois Creek
Harlem River (tidal strait)
Harrison Creek
Haskell Creek
Hemlock Creek (New York)
Honeoye Creek
Hoosic River
Hudson River
Hunters Creek
Hunts Creek
Hutchinson River
Independence River
Indian Creek
Indian River (Black Lake)
Indian River (Hudson River tributary)
Indian River (Mettawee River tributary)
Indian River (Moose River tributary)
Indian River (West Canada Creek tributary)
Irondequoit Creek
Ischua Creek
Jackson Creek
Jan De Bakkers Kill
Jessup River
Johnson Creek
Jordan River
Kaaterskill Creek
Kayaderosseras Creek
Kennyetto Creek
Keuka Lake Outlet
Kill Van Kull (tidal strait)
Kinderhook Creek
Kisco River
Kline Kill
Kunjamuk River
La Chute
Lake Creek
Lake Ozonia Outlet
Lansing Kill
Ley Creek
Lidell Creek
Little Ausable River
Little Black Creek
Little Chazy River
Little Delaware River
Little Genesee Creek
Little Hoosic River
Little River (Fish Creek tributary)
Little River (Grass River tributary)
Little River (Mad River tributary)
Little River (Oswegatchie River tributary)
Little River (Peconic River tributary)
Little Salmon River (Lake Ontario)
Little Salmon River (St. Lawrence River tributary)
Little Sixmile Creek (Grand Island, New York)
Little Snake Creek
Little Trout River
Little Valley Creek
Little Wappinger Creek
Little West Kill
Little Woodhull Creek
Long Pond Outlet
Loyal Creek
Mad River (Fish Creek tributary)
Mad River (Salmon River tributary)
Mahwah River
Mamaroneck River
Mansfield Creek
Marble River
Marion River
Meads Creek
Melzingah Brook
Merrill Creek
Mettawee River
Miami River
Mianus River
Middle Branch Grass River
Middle Branch Moose River
Middle Branch Oswegatchie River
Middle Mongaup River
Mill Brook
Mill Creek (Hudson River tributary)
Mill Creek (Lake Ontario)
Mill Creek (Owasco Inlet)
Mill River (Long Island)
Mill River (Rippowam River tributary)
Mill River (Swamp River tributary)
Mineral Spring Brook
Minerva Stream
Mohawk River
Mongaup River
Moodna Creek
Moordener Kill
Moose Creek (Raquette River tributary)
Moose Creek (Sugar River tributary)
Moose River
Moses Kill
Mosher Brook
Moyer Creek
Mud Creek (Cohocton River tributary)
Mud Creek (Otselic River tributary)
Muddy Kill
Mudlick Creek
Muitzes Kill
Mullet Creek
Muscoot River
Muskrat Pond Outlet
Nanticoke Creek
Neversink River
Newcomb River
Newtown Creek in New York City
Newtown Creek (Chemung River tributary)
Niagara River
Ninemile Creek (Lake Ontario tributary)
Ninemile Creek (Mohawk River tributary)
Ninemile Creek (Onondaga Lake tributary)
Nissequogue River
Normans Kill
North Branch Boquet River
North Branch Callicoon Creek
North Branch Grass River
North Branch Great Chazy River
North Branch Little Salmon River
North Branch Moose River
North Branch Salmon River
North Branch Sandy Creek
North Branch Saranac River
North Branch Tuscarora Creek
North Chuctanunda Creek
North Creek
North Fork Cowanesque River
North River (the lower Hudson River)
Northwest Bay Brook
Nowadaga Creek
Oak Orchard Creek
Oaks Creek
Oatka Creek
Ohisa Creek
Oil Creek
Olean Creek
Oneida Creek
Oneida River
Onesquethaw Creek
Onion River
Onondaga Creek
Onondaga Lake Outlet
Opalescent River
Oriskany Creek
Osgood River
Oswayo Creek
Oswegatchie River
Oswego River
Otego Creek
Otis Creek
Otselic River
Otsquago Creek
Otsquene Creek
Otstungo Creek
Otter Brook
Otter Creek (Black River tributary)
Otter Creek (Indian River tributary)
Otter Kill
Ouleout Creek
Owasco Inlet
Owasco Outlet
Owego Creek
Page Brook
Palmer Creek
Patchogue River
Patterson Brook
Paul Creek
Peconic River
Peekskill Hollow Creek
Perch River
Phelps Creek
Phillipin Kill
Phinney Creek
Pike Creek
Pine Creek
Pipe Creek
Piseco Outlet
Plattekill Creek
Platte Kill
Pocantico River
Pochuck Creek
Poesten Kill
Point Rock Creek
Popolopen Creek
Post Creek
Potic Creek
Poultney River
Plum Brook
Purdy Creek
Quacken Kill
Quassaick Creek
Ramapo River
Raquette River 
Red House Brook
Red River
Richmond Creek
Ringwood River
Rippowam River
Roaring Brook
Robinson River
Rock River
Roeliff-Jansen Kill
Rondout Creek
Round Lake Stream
Rush Creek
Sacandaga River
Saddle River
Saint Lawrence River
Saint Regis River
Salmon Creek (Cayuga Lake)
Salmon Creek (Lake Ontario)
Salmon River (Lake Champlain)
Salmon River (New York)
Salmon River (Raquette River tributary)
Salmon River (St. Lawrence River tributary)
Sandusky River (Seneca River tributary)
Sandy Creek (Jefferson County, New York)
Sandy Creek (Monroe County, New York)
Sangerfield River
Saranac River
Sauquoit Creek
Saw Kill
Saw Kill (Esopus Creek tributary)
Saw Mill River
Sawyer Kill
Scajaquada Creek
Schenevus Creek
Schodack Creek
Schoharie Creek
Schroon River
Schuyler Creek
Scriba Creek
Seeley Creek
Seneca River
Shawangunk Kill
Shekomeko Creek
Sheldrake River
Sheldrake Stream
Silvermine River
Sing Sing Brook
Sixmile Creek
Slocum Creek
Snake Creek
Snook Kill
South Branch Cattaraugus Creek
South Branch Eighteenmile Creek
South Branch Grass River
South Branch Moose River
South Branch West Canada Creek
South Chuctanunda Creek
South Creek
South Inlet (Raquette Lake)
South Sandy Creek
Sparkill Creek
Speonk River
Spicer Creek (Grand Island, New York)
Sprite Creek
Sprout Creek
Spruce Creek
Steele Creek
Sterling Creek
Stillwater Creek
Stone Hill River
Stony Brook (St. Regis River tributary)
Stony Clove Creek
Stony Creek (Hudson River tributary)
Stony Creek (Lake Ontario)
Stony Kill
Sturdevant Creek
Sucker Brook
Sugar River
Susquehanna River
Swamp River
Swan River
Switz Kill
Tackawasick Creek
Taghkanic Creek
Tanner Creek (Grass River tributary)
Taughannock Creek
Tenmile Creek (Catskill Creek tributary)
Tenmile River (Delaware River tributary)
Tenmile River (Housatonic River tributary)
The Branch
Tioga River
Tioughnioga River
Titicus River
Tomhannock Creek
Tonawanda Creek
Treadwell Creek
Tremper Kill
Troups Creek
Trout Brook (Deer River tributary)
Trout Brook (Raquette River tributary)
Trout Brook (Schroon River tributary)
Trout Brook (St. Regis River tributary)
Trout River
Trumansburg Creek
Tunungwant Creek
Tuscarora Creek
Twentymile Creek
Two Mile Creek
Unadilla River
Valatie Kill
Van Campen Creek
Vandermark Creek
Virgil Creek
Vloman Kill
Waccabuc River
Wading River
Wallkill River
Walloomsac River
Wampus River
Wappasening Creek
Wappinger Creek
Webatuck Creek
West Branch Ausable River
West Branch Cazenovia Creek
West Branch Croton River
West Branch Deer River (Black River tributary)
West Branch Deer River (St. Regis River tributary)
West Branch Delaware River
West Branch Mongaup River
West Branch Neversink River
West Branch Oswegatchie River
West Branch Owego Creek
West Branch Sacandaga River
West Branch St. Regis River
West Branch Tioughnioga River
West Canada Creek
West Creek (Cobleskill Creek tributary)
West Creek (Indian River tributary)
West Kill
West River
West Stony Creek
Westchester Creek
Wharton Creek
White River
Willowemoc Creek
Willseyville Creek
Windfall Brook
Wiscoy Creek
Whortlekill Creek
Wood Creek
Woodhull Creek
Woodland Creek
Woods Creek (Grand Island, New York)
Wrights Creek
Wylie Brook
Wynants Kill
Wyomanock Creek

See also
List of waterways
List of canals in the United States
List of rivers in the United States

External links
New York Streamflow Data from the USGS

References
USGS Geographic Names Information Service
USGS Hydrologic Unit Map - State of New York (1974)

New York
 
Rivers